Dorf is a surname. Notable people with the surname include:

 Barbara Dorf (1933–2016), British artist
 Erling Dorf (1905–1984), American geologist and paleobotanist
 Michael Dorf (disambiguation)
 Richard C. Dorf (born 1933), Professor Emeritus of Management and Electrical and Computer Engineering at the University of California, Davis
 Shel Dorf (1933–2009), American comic-book letterer